Karawari may refer to:

Karawari language of Papua New Guinea
Karawari Rural LLG of Papua New Guinea
Homalonesiota karawari (sp. beetle - Homalonesiota)